Djibouti Telecom (Djibouti Télécommunication Co.) is the government-run telecommunications monopoly in Djibouti, Djibouti. It provides landline, mobile, and internet services to the general public. The firm has its head offices and outlets in the national capital.  In late 2013 the company finally unveiled its 3G service throughout the country and as of 2017 has unveiled 4G+ service. The company's main internet offerings for internet throughout the country are currently specifically focused on ADSL service.

References

External links
 Djibouti Telecom official site
 Djibouti Online Phonebook
 Djibouti Telecom page at Djibouti Phonebook

Telecommunications companies of Djibouti
Companies with year of establishment missing
Companies based in Djibouti (city)